Larssen is a Norwegian surname which may refer to:
Anna Larssen (1875–1955), Danish actress and preacher
Georg Hagerup-Larssen (1903–1982), Norwegian engineer and businessperson
Heidi Larssen (born 1951), Norwegian politician
John Olav Larssen (1927–2009), Norwegian evangelical preacher and missionary
Lars Andreas Larssen (1935–2014), Norwegian stage, film and television actor
Olav Larssen (1894–1981), Norwegian newspaper editor and politician
Per Larssen (1881–1947), Norwegian engineer, Minister of Trade 1931-1932
Rolf Falk-Larssen (born 1960), Norwegian speed skater
Svein Døvle Larssen (1928–2015), Norwegian newspaper editor
Trude Brænne Larssen (born 1967), Norwegian novelist

See also
Larsen
Larsson
Larson (surname)

Patronymic surnames